Cienega Springs is a census-designated place in La Paz County, Arizona, United States. Its population was 1,690 as of the 2020 census.

Geography
The community is in northwestern La Paz County, along the Colorado River. It is bordered to the southwest by the community of Bluewater and to the northwest, across the river, by the state of California. Arizona State Route 95 mostly forms the southeast edge of the Cienega Springs CDP. The highway leads southwest  to Parker, the La Paz county seat, and northeast  to Parker Dam on the Colorado River, forming Lake Havasu.

Utilities
Cienega Springs is served by the Cienga Water Company.

Demographics

References

Census-designated places in La Paz County, Arizona